The United States national team has participated in all fifteen editions of the CONCACAF Gold Cup since its foundation in 1991 to replace the CONCACAF Championship. The United States is also the second-most successful team in the tournament, having won seven titles since the beginning of the Gold Cup, behind Mexico by just two titles. Before the Gold Cup however, the United States only qualified for two of the previous ten CONCACAF Championships (1985 and 1989).

Since its inception in 1991, the CONCACAF Gold Cup is continually hosted or co-hosted by the United States (due to the United States being the only country that can host a profitable tournament), therefore the United States have frequently participated in the tournament and are considered to be one of the two major teams alongside Mexico. They have reached the final twelve times, losing five out of seven times when facing Mexico, but winning the other five finals against various opponents.

Overall record

Winning finals

With three titles, Bruce Arena is the most successful coach in tournament history. Bora Milutinovic went on to win the 1996 tournament as head coach of Mexico.

Record by opponent

1985 CONCACAF Championship

Group 3

1989 CONCACAF Championship

Final round

The Championship also served as 1990 World Cup qualification, which helped the U.S. to qualify for the World Cup for the first time since 1950.

1991 CONCACAF Gold Cup

Group B

Semi-finals

Final

1993 CONCACAF Gold Cup

Group A

Semi-finals

Final

1996 CONCACAF Gold Cup

Group C

Semifinals

Third place match

1998 CONCACAF Gold Cup

Group C

Semi-finals

Final

2000 CONCACAF Gold Cup

Group B

Quarter-finals

2002 CONCACAF Gold Cup

Group B

Quarter-finals

Semi-finals

Final

2003 CONCACAF Gold Cup

Group C

Quarter-finals

Semi-finals

Third place match

2005 CONCACAF Gold Cup

Group B

Quarter-finals

Semi-finals

Final

2007 CONCACAF Gold Cup

Group B

Quarter-finals

Semi-finals

Final

2009 CONCACAF Gold Cup

Group B

Quarter-finals

Semi-finals

Final

2011 CONCACAF Gold Cup

Group C

Quarter-finals

Semi-finals

Final

2013 CONCACAF Gold Cup

Group C

Quarter-finals

Semi-finals

Final

2015 CONCACAF Gold Cup

Group A

Quarter-finals

Semi-finals

Third place match

2017 CONCACAF Gold Cup

Group B

Quarter-finals

Semi-finals

Final

2019 CONCACAF Gold Cup

Group D

Quarter-finals

Semi-finals

Final

2021 CONCACAF Gold Cup

Group B

Quarter-finals

Semi-finals

Final

Record players

Landon Donovan is both the CONCACAF Gold Cup's record player and scorer with 18 goals in 33 matches. In addition, he and DaMarcus Beasley are the only players to win the Gold Cup four times.

Top goalscorers

Landon Donovan is not only the CONCACAF Gold Cup's record scorer, but is also the only player to score at six separate tournaments, and the only player to be (shared) top scorer at three tournaments.

In 2007, he scored all his four goals from the penalty spot.

Awards and records

Team awards
Champions: 1991, 2002, 2005, 2007, 2013, 2017, 2021
Runners-up: 1989, 1993, 1998, 2009, 2011, 2019
Third place: 1996, 2003
Fair Play Award: 2003, 2009, 2017, 2019, 2021

Individual awards
Most Valuable Player: 
Brian McBride (2002)
Landon Donovan (2013)
Michael Bradley (2017)
Golden Boot: 
Eric Wynalda (1996, 4 goals)
Brian McBride (2002, 4 goals)
Landon Donovan (2003, 4 goals) (shared)
DaMarcus Beasley (2005, 3 goals)
Landon Donovan (2013, 5 goals) (shared)
Chris Wondolowski (2013, 5 goals) (shared)
Clint Dempsey (2015, 7 goals)
Best Goalkeeper: 
Brad Guzan (2015)
Matt Turner (2021)
Best Young Player:
Christian Pulisic (2019)

Team records
Most finals played in a row (5: 2005–2013)
Most Top 3 finishes in a row (7: 2002–2013)
Highest defeat in a final (0–5 against Mexico, 2009)

Individual records
Most titles as player: Landon Donovan and DaMarcus Beasley (4: 2002, 2005, 2007 and 2013)
Most titles as manager: Bruce Arena (3: 2002, 2005 and 2017)
Most matches played: Landon Donovan (33: 2002–2013)
Most goals scored: Landon Donovan (18: 2002–2013)
Longest time span between first and last goal: Clint Dempsey (12 years, 15 days: July 7, 2005 – July 22, 2017)

References

 
Countries at the CONCACAF Gold Cup
United States men's national soccer team